U.S. Route 60 has 25 current special routes.  Of these, 20 are business routes, two alternate routes, one bypass route, and one truck route. US 60 has also had one additional business route, an additional bypass route, a temporary route,  and another truck route (all now decommissioned).

Tonkawa  business loop

Business US 60 in Tonkawa begins at an interchange on the north side of Tonkawa.  It heads south in a concurrency with U.S. Route 77, then turns east on North Avenue.  East of Tonkawa, the route turns back north to reunite with the main route.

Ponca City business loop

Business US 60 in Ponca City begins at an interchange with US 60 and US 177 (the E. W. Marland Memorial Highway) and continues east down South Avenue. It turns north onto Pine Street, heading into the downtown area, east on Central, and north on Union Street.  It turns east again onto Grand Avenue.  At 14th Street, it turns south, forming a concurrency with U.S. Route 77.  It rejoins the main highway in the southeast part of the city.

Seneca business loop

Business US 60 in Seneca begins west of the city in Oklahoma.  It follows an old alignment of US 60 into the town, crossing the state line at the city limits.  At Route 43, it turns south (and off the old alignment of US 60) back to the main highway. US 60 Bus., on the west side of Route 43, serves as a truck bypass route for a steep grade just south of Seneca.

Neosho business loop

Business US 60 in Neosho begins at the intersection of US 60 and U.S. Route 71 Business.  The road briefly forms a concurrency with Business US 71, before turning off and heading north on Neosho Boulevard.  At Harmony Street, the road begins another concurrency with Route 86.  Neosho Boulevard curves east becoming Coler Street, then Business US 60 turns north on College Street (leaving Route 86), which rejoins the main highway northeast of the city at an interchange.

Monett business loop

Business US 60 in Monett begins at Kyler Street (in a concurrency with Route H) in south central Monett.  It crosses over a viaduct, where Kyler Street becomes 13th Street and joins the old alignment of US 60 in the city.  At Cleveland Street, the concurrency with Route H ends and the business route turns east, eventually rejoining the main route east of the city.

Verona-Aurora business loop

Business US 60 in the Verona–Aurora area begins southwest of Verona, through which it briefly passes.  After leaving Verona, the road heads east through a rural area becoming South Street in Aurora.  The street curves around, becoming Church Street.  At Elliot Avenue is an intersection with Missouri routes 39 and 265.  The road continues down Church Street, curving southeast and rejoining the main route southeast of Aurora.  Sections of this route (but not the entire route) are part of old US 60.

Rogersville business loop

Business US 60 in Rogersville is an old alignment of US 60 its entire length.  The highway follows Center Street, leaving the main highway which curves to the south.  Where the main highway curves back north east of the city, the business route rejoins the main route.

Mansfield business loop

Business US 60 in Mansfield begins at the interchange of US 60 and Route 5, with which the business route is briefly united.  It joins the old highway alignment just south of the interchange, turning east.  The route curves around to become Clark Street, which angles off to become Commercial Street in the downtown area.  In the middle of the city, the business route leaves the old alignment (which continues down Route A) and turns north to rejoin the main route in the northeast corner of Mansfield.

Mountain Grove business loop

Business US 60 in Mountain Grove begins on the west side of the city at an interchange with US 60.  It follows the old alignment of US 60, heading into the city on Third Street.  In the center of Mountain Grove is an intersection with Route 95.  Third Street becomes State Street east of downtown and the business route leaves Mountain Grove.  It rejoins the main route east of Mountain Grove at the unincorporated community of Dunn.

Cabool business loop

Business US 60 in Cabool follows an old alignment of US 60 through the city.  West of the city, the business route leaves the main highway at an interchange and enters Cabool as Ozark Street.  At Elm Street is the northern terminus of Route 181.  Ozark Street curves to the northeast, eventually intersecting U.S. Route 63.  Business 60 turns south in a concurrency with US 63 and rejoins the main highway southeast of Cabool.

Willow Springs business loop

Business US 60 in Willow Springs is joined with Business US 63 its entire length (as are the main highways around the city).  In downtown Willow Springs, Business 60/63 intersects Route 137 at Harris Street.  The business routes rejoin the main highway on the southeast part of the city.

Van Buren business loop

Business US 60 in Van Buren begins in the southern part of the city, leaving the main highway going west on James Street.  At Main Street, the business route turns north, turning northeast.  It rejoins the main highway east of Van Buren.

Poplar Bluff business loop

Business US 60 in Poplar Bluff begins in the northwest corner of the city at the interchange of US 60 and US 67 (Future I-57).  It begins in a concurrency with Business US 67.  At Pine Boulevard, Business US 60 leaves the concurrency, turning east.  Pine Boulevard curves to run northeast through the city, and the business route rejoins the main route east of the city.

Dexter business loop

Business US 60 in Dexter begins on the west side of the city and head east.  At Walnut Street is an intersection with Business Route 25.  In the eastern part of the city, is an intersection with non-special Route 25, where Business US 60 turns north and joins Route 25.  The business route rejoins the main route northeast of Dexter.

Sikeston business loop

Business US 60 in Sikeston begins southwest of the city, turning north off the main highway at a junction with Route FF.  The road turns east at the terminus of Route 114 and becomes Malone Avenue, paralleling the Union Pacific Railroad tracks.  At Park Avenue is an intersection with Business US 61.  A few blocks east of this intersection is an intersection with U.S. Routes 61 and 62.  US 62 continues east here, Business US 60 eastbound, southbound US 61, and westbound US 62 head south.  These three highways intersect US 60 at an interchange on the south side of Dexter, where Business US 60 ends.

Paducah business loop

Business US 60 in Paducah begins at Park Avenue where US 60 turns south.  At HC Mathis Drive is an intersection with U.S. Route 45.  Near the Ohio River, Park Avenue curves south becoming Fourth Street.  Fourth Street angles off to become Third Street, which curves around to become Wayne Sullivan Drive.  In the southeast part of Paducah, the business route rejoins the main highway.

Cloverport business loop

Business US 60 in Cloverport begins southwest of the city in a concurrency with Kentucky Route 144.  It heads east into the city, then north towards the Ohio River, and heads east near the river.  At Elm Street is an intersection with Kentucky Route 105.  The highway curves around, rejoining the main route in the southwest part of Cloverport.

Louisville alternate route

Alternate US 60 in Louisville begins at the intersection of the Dixie Highway (US 60 and U.S. Route 31W) and KY 2049, turning east onto 7th Street Road.  It zigzags through the area, following Berry Boulevard, Taylor Boulevard, Central Avenue (at the entrance to Churchill Downs racetrack, home of The Kentucky Derby and Kentucky Oaks), Crittenden Drive, and Eastern Parkway.  It passes beside the University of Louisville, and just east of there it has an interchange with Interstate 65.  At Bardstown Road (US 31E/US 150), it turns off onto Cherokee Parkway, then angles off onto Lexington Road, crossing over Interstate 64.  At St. Matthews, it rejoins the main highway.

Versailles business loop

Business US 60 is the business route through the city of Versailles. Business US 60 is in a concurrency with US 62 to the downtown area, then heads east to join US 60 on the east side of Versailles.

Lexington business loop

Business US 60 began on the west side of the city on Versailles Road at New Circle Road (which carried Bypass US 60).  Versailles Road heads downtown becoming High Street.  High Street curves south through the downtown area.  It leaves downtown on Midland Avenue, then Winchester Road.  It rejoined the bypass route on the east side of Lexington at New Circle Road.

Lexington bypass route

Bypass US 60 serves as a northern bypass of Lexington. It is co-signed with Kentucky Route 4, commonly known as New Circle Road. At Leestown Pike is an intersection with U.S. Route 421 and at Georgetown Road is an intersection with U.S. Route 25.  The road is a freeway to this point, where it becomes a divided highway.  At Paris Pike is an intersection with U.S. Route 27 and U.S. Route 68.  At Winchester Road, the bypass rejoins the business route to become non-special US 60.

Clifton Forge business loop

Business US 60 in Clifton Forge begins at the Interstate 64 exit 24 on the west side of the city.  It starts in a concurrency with Business US 220 and is united with that road to A Street, where Business 220 turns south.  After leaving Clifton Forge, Business US 60 joins non-special U.S. Route 220 and passes through Cliftondale Park before rejoining the main highway at the I-64 exit 27.

Richmond truck route

Truck US 60 in Richmond begins where US 60 turns north from Midlothan Turnpike onto Roanoke Street. It continues east along Midlothan Turnpike until it joins U.S. Route 360 (Hull Street) at the intersection of Clapton Street, and runs in concurrency with US 360, crossing the Mayo Bridge over the James River, and finally ending at US 60 between Cary Street and Main Street.

Norfolk alternate route

Alternate US 60 in Norfolk runs along VA 168 (Tidewater Drive) from US 60 to US 460 (Granby Street), and along US 460 between VA 168 and US 60.

Former special routes

Arizona temporary route

Temporary US 60 connected Globe and Springerville, Arizona in the 1950s.  It was united with U.S. Route 70 from Globe to Peridot, then turned north through Fort Apache, Whiteriver, McNary, and Eagar, Arizona.  It is now State Routes 170, 73, 260, and some local roads in the San Carlos Apache and Fort Apache Indian Reservations.

Springfield business loop

Business US 60 in Springfield connected the main route with the downtown area.  US 60 followed Sunshine Street and Glenstone Avenue when Business 60 was active.  It began at Sunshine Avenue and Scenic Street, heading north to College Street (an earlier alignment of US 60).  The route headed east through Park Central Square, then east on St. Louis Street to Glenstone Avenue.  It turned south on Glenstone to rejoin the main route at Sunshine.  Over time, Business US 60 had concurrencies with U.S. Route 66 Business and Business US 166.

Former Owensboro bypass route

Bypass US 60 was a loop around the city of Owensboro; the main route passed through the downtown area.  The road was a freeway with exit numbers. In April 2011, in conjunction with the KY Transportation Cabinet, U.S. 60 no longer passes through downtown and the former "bypass" is the main U.S. 60 route.

References

60

60
60
60
60
60